Timothy Carter Cossins (born March 31, 1970) is an American professional baseball coach for the Baltimore Orioles of Major League Baseball.

Career
Cossins graduated from Santa Rosa High School in Santa Rosa, California. He attended Santa Rosa Junior College, and transferred to the University of Oklahoma and played college baseball for the Oklahoma Sooners. The Pittsburgh Pirates selected Cossins in the 39th round of the 1992 MLB draft, but he did not sign with Pittsburgh, returning to Oklahoma. The Texas Rangers selected him in the 16th round of the 1993 MLB draft. He played in Minor League Baseball through 2000. After his playing career, he worked for the Miami Marlins as a minor league manager for four years, and then became the Marlins' minor league catching coordinator in 2007. He was hired by the Chicago Cubs after the 2012 season to be their minor league field coordinator, succeeding Brandon Hyde, who was promoted to be the Cubs' director of player development.

The Baltimore Orioles hired Cossins from the Cubs after the 2018 season to join Hyde's coaching staff. He will serve as a major league field coordinator and catching instructor.

Personal life
Cossins lives in Santa Rosa, California. He and his wife have a son who served as a volunteer firefighter during the October 2017 Northern California wildfires.

References

External links

1970 births
Living people
Baltimore Orioles coaches
Baseball catchers
Baseball coaches from California
Baseball players from California
Charleston Rainbows players
Charleston RiverDogs players
Erie Sailors players
Gulf Coast Rangers players
Harrisburg Senators players
Hudson Valley Renegades players
Major League Baseball coaches
Minor league baseball managers
Oklahoma Sooners baseball players
Charlotte Rangers players
Sonoma County Crushers players
Sportspeople from Santa Rosa, California
Tampa Yankees players
Tulsa Drillers players